The 2016–17 Luge World Cup was a multi race tournament over a season for luge, organised by the FIL.The season started on 26 November 2016 in Winterberg, Germany and ended on 25 February 2017 in Altenberg, Germany.

Calendar

Results

Men's singles

Women's singles

Doubles

Team relay

Standings

Men's singles 

Final standings after 12 events
(*Champion 2016)

Men's singles Sprint 

Final standings after 3 events
(*Champion 2016)
Only 6 lugers competed on all events

Women's singles 

Final standings after 12 events
(*Champion 2016)

Women's singles Sprint 

Final standings after 3 events
Only 8 lugers competed on all events

Doubles 

Final standings after 12 events
(*Champion 2016)

Doubles Sprint 

Final standings after 3 events
(*Champion 2016)
Only 9 double sleds competed on all events

Team Relay 

Final standings after 6 events
(*Champion 2016)

Medal table

References

2016-17
2016 in luge
2017 in luge
Luge